Rovetta (Bergamasque:  or ) is a comune (municipality) in the Province of Bergamo in the Italian region of Lombardy, located about  northeast of Milan and about  northeast of Bergamo.

The municipality of Rovetta contains the frazione (subdivision) S. Lorenzo.

Rovetta borders the following municipalities: Castione della Presolana, Cerete, Clusone, Colere, Fino del Monte, Gandino, Oltressenda Alta, Songavazzo, Villa d'Ogna, Vilminore di Scalve.

Demographic evolution

Twin towns — sister cities
Rovetta is twinned with:

  Vilafant, Spain

See also
Rovetta massacre

References